Jerez Fútbol Sala was a futsal club based in Jerez de la Frontera, city in the autonomous community of Andalusia. Caja San Fernando Jerez was during several years the most important futsal club from Andalusia.

The club had the sponsorships of Bodegas Garvey and Caja San Fernando.

History
Jerez FS was founded in 1978 and its stadium was Pabellón José Mª Ruíz Mateos with capacity of 1,220 seats. The team played ten consecutive seasons in the División de Honor. For its two last seasons, 2000–01 and 2001–02, the team was forced to play in a nearby city, San Fernando, due to the home ground's not meeting the parquet approval.

Honours
División de Honor: 0
Quarterfinals: 1997–98

Season to season

11 seasons in División de Honor
2 seasons in División de Plata

References

External links
Former Official Website

Futsal clubs in Spain
Sports teams in Andalusia
Futsal clubs established in 1978
Sports clubs disestablished in 2002
1978 establishments in Spain
2002 disestablishments in Spain
Sport in Jerez de la Frontera